Constance Yu-Hwa Chung (born August 20, 1946) is an American journalist who has been a news anchor and reporter for the U.S. television news networks NBC, CBS, ABC, CNN, and MSNBC. Some of her more famous interview subjects include Claus von Bülow and U.S. Representative Gary Condit, whom Chung interviewed first after the Chandra Levy disappearance, and basketball legend Magic Johnson after he went public about being HIV-positive. In 1993, she became the second woman to co-anchor a network newscast as part of CBS Evening News.

Early life and education 
The youngest of ten children, Chung was born in Washington, D.C., less than a year after her family emigrated from China and was raised in D.C. Her father, William Ling Chung, was an intelligence officer in the Chinese Nationalist Government and five of her siblings died during wartime.

She graduated from Montgomery Blair High School in Silver Spring, Maryland, and went on to receive a degree in journalism at the University of Maryland, College Park, in 1969.

Early career 
Chung was a Washington-based correspondent for the CBS Evening News with Walter Cronkite in the early 1970s, during the Watergate political scandal. Later, Chung left to anchor evening newscasts for KNXT (now KCBS-TV), the network's owned and operated station in Los Angeles. Chung also anchored the network's primetime news updates (CBS Newsbreak) for West Coast stations from the KNXT studios at Columbia Square during her tenure there.

In early 2018, Chung was asked if she was sexually harassed in her career. She replied "Oh, yeah! Oh, sure. Yeah. Every day. I mean, a lot. Especially when I started out." Later that year, following Christine Blasey Ford's testimony to the Senate Judiciary Committee of being sexually assaulted by Brett Kavanaugh, Chung wrote an open letter to Blasey-Ford saying that she too was sexually assaulted when she was in college, and the person who assaulted her was the doctor who delivered her.

NBC 
In 1983, Chung returned to network news as anchor of NBC's new early program, NBC News at Sunrise, which was scheduled as the lead-in to the Today program. She was also anchor of the Saturday edition of NBC Nightly News and filled in for Tom Brokaw on weeknights. NBC also created two newsmagazines, American Almanac and 1986, which she co-hosted with Roger Mudd.

CBS 
In 1989, Chung left NBC for CBS, where she hosted Saturday Night with Connie Chung (later renamed Face to Face with Connie Chung) (1989–90) and anchored the CBS Sunday Evening News (1989–93). On June 1, 1993, she became the second woman (after Barbara Walters with ABC in 1976) to co-anchor a major network's national weekday news broadcast. While hosting the CBS Evening News, Chung also hosted a side project on CBS, Eye to Eye with Connie Chung. After her co-anchoring duties with Dan Rather ended in 1995, Chung left CBS. She eventually jumped to ABC News, where she cohosted the Monday edition of 20/20 with Charles Gibson and began independent interviews, a field that would soon become her trademark.

Kathleen Gingrich interview 
In a January 5, 1995, interview with Kathleen Gingrich, mother of Republican politician Newt Gingrich, on Eye to Eye, Mrs. Gingrich said she could not say what her son thought about First Lady Hillary Clinton on the air. Chung asked Mrs. Gingrich to "just whisper it to me, just between you and me," and Mrs. Gingrich's microphone volume was turned up as she replied "He thinks she's a bitch." Many people interpreted Chung's suggestion that if Mrs. Gingrich would whisper this statement it would be promised that the statement would be off the record. Bill Carter for The New York Times reported, "Ms. Chung had become the object of some of the most ferocious criticism, justified or not, ever directed at any network anchor as a result of her now infamous interview with Speaker Newt Gingrich's mother, Kathleen."  The interview was also parodied on Saturday Night Live.

Oklahoma City bombing interview 
A few months later, in the wake of the April 1995 Oklahoma City bombing, Chung was widely criticized for sarcasm as she asked an Oklahoma City Fire Department spokesman, "Can the Oklahoma City Fire Department handle this?" Many Oklahomans felt the question was insensitive to the situation. A few women created "Bite Me, Connie Chung" shirts in response to the interview. Thousands of viewers in Oklahoma and elsewhere called and wrote letters of protest over the tone of the questions. Moreover, co-anchor Dan Rather was irate that Chung was sent from New York to the assignment while he was already in nearby Texas. Consequently, after public outcry, and Rather's complaints, Chung was given a choice to resign or move to weekend anchor or morning anchor. Chung left the network after being removed as co-anchor of CBS Evening News.

ABC 
In 1997, Chung moved to ABC News as a reporter on 20/20 and cohost of the Monday edition of the program alongside Charles Gibson. In 2001, she conducted an interview with Gary Condit on Primetime Thursday, focusing on his relationship with murdered Washington, D.C., intern Chandra Levy.

She was a guest host of the morning program Good Morning America. After short-lived host Lisa McRee left the program, Chung declined to take over on a permanent basis, saying she did not want to broadcast 10 hours a week in the early morning. She also was on ABC 2000 Today in Las Vegas.

CNN 
Chung, for a short time, hosted her own show on CNN titled Connie Chung Tonight, for which she was paid $2 million per year. Though her arrival at CNN was heavily hyped by the network, her show was panned by critics. CNN changed her show from live to tape-delay to improve its continuity. Although it performed moderately well in the ratings (a 500,000 increase in viewers), her show was suspended once the 2003 Iraq War began. During the war, she was reduced to reading hourly headlines. Once CNN resumed regular programming, Chung requested that CNN resume broadcasting her show as soon as possible. The network responded by cancelling it, even though her contract had not yet expired. In an interview, CNN founder Ted Turner called the show "just awful."

Martina Navratilova interview 
In July 2002, Chung interviewed tennis player Martina Navratilova, who at that time had been a naturalized U.S. citizen for more than 20 years, about her recent criticisms of the U.S. political system. Chung labeled these criticisms "un-American" and "unpatriotic" and suggested Navratilova should "go back to Czechoslovakia" (which had ceased to be a united nation nine years earlier) rather than use her celebrity status to gain a platform for her complaints. When Navratilova asked why it was unpatriotic to speak out, Chung replied, "Well, you know the old line, love it or leave it."

MSNBC 
In January 2006, Chung and Maury Povich began hosting a show titled Weekends with Maury and Connie on MSNBC. It was Chung's first appearance as a television host since 2003. The show was later canceled and aired its final episode on June 17, 2006. In this episode, Chung, dressed in a white evening gown and dancing on top of a black piano, sang a parody to the tune of "Thanks for the Memory." Video clips of the off-key farewell performance circulated on internet video sites. Chung commented, "All I want to be sure of is that viewers understood it was a giant self-parody. If anyone took it seriously, they really need to get a life." On the June 27, 2006 episode of The Tonight Show, Jay Leno interviewed Chung about her "Thanks for the Memory" parody. During the interview, Chung poked fun at her show's low ratings, referring to the musical number as a "private joke for our two viewers."

Interview style 
Chung's interviews were largely gentle, but often they were punctuated by a rapid-fire barrage of sharp questions. Despite this, her interviews were still widely recognized as being softer than those of other interviewers, such as Barbara Walters or Mike Wallace. Consequently, her interviews were often used as a public relations move by those looking to overcome scandal or controversy. Some of her more famous interview subjects include Claus von Bülow and U.S. Representative Gary Condit, whom Chung interviewed first after the Chandra Levy disappearance. Chung was the first journalist to interview basketball player Earvin "Magic" Johnson after he announced he was HIV-positive.

Chung was a judge for the Miss Universe 2011 contest.

Teaching 
Chung accepted a teaching fellowship at the John F. Kennedy School of Government at Harvard University. While at Harvard, she wrote a discussion paper titled The Business of Getting "The Get": Nailing an Exclusive Interview in Prime Time.

Personal life 
Chung has been married to talk show host Maury Povich since 1984 and they have one adopted son, Matthew Jay Povich, who they adopted on June 20, 1995. Chung converted to Judaism at the time of her marriage to Povich. According to Maury Povich, "She knows more Yiddish than you." Chung has since become devoted to the faith, and she attends synagogue with her family. Chung has noted publicly that she and Povich maintain a kosher lifestyle year-round. Chung was parodied in Bloom County in 1986 when the penguin Opus Dopus wanted to marry her, referring to Chung as the "lusty-eyed, hot Mama of the new hour."

Career timeline 
1976–1983: Evening news co-anchor at CBS-owned KNXT in Los Angeles
1983–1986: NBC News at Sunrise anchor
1983–1989: NBC Nightly News Saturday anchor
1989–1990: Saturday Night with Connie Chung/Face to Face with Connie Chung anchor
1989–1993: CBS Sunday Evening News anchor
1993–1995: CBS Evening News co-anchor (with Dan Rather)
1993–1995: Eye to Eye with Connie Chung anchor
1998–2000: 20/20 anchor
1999–2000: ABC 2000 Today correspondent
2002–2003: Connie Chung Tonight anchor
2006: Weekends with Maury and Connie anchor

See also 
 Chinese Americans in New York City
 New Yorkers in journalism

Explanatory notes

References

External links 

Maury Povich and Connie Chung Discuss Work and Family on Larry King Live
Lifetime's Intimate Portrait: Connie Chung
Mates: Maury and Connie – New York Magazine
"Countdown with Keith Olbermann" for June 22, 2006: Interview with Connie Chung after her farewell song
Connie Chung, The Business of Getting "The Get": Nailing an Exclusive Interview in Prime Time April, 1998. D-28.
Connie Chung  Video produced by Makers: Women Who Make America
 

1946 births
20th-century American journalists
21st-century American journalists
60 Minutes correspondents
ABC News personalities
American journalists of Chinese descent
American writers of Taiwanese descent
American women writers of Chinese descent
American television reporters and correspondents
American women television journalists
CBS News people
CNN people
Converts to Judaism
Journalists from Washington, D.C.
Living people
MSNBC people
Naturalized citizens of the United States
NBC News people
People from Bethesda, Maryland
Television anchors from Los Angeles
University of Maryland, College Park alumni
People from the Upper West Side
American women journalists of Asian descent
21st-century American women